Lynne Olson (born August 19, 1949) is an American author, historian and journalist. She was born on August 19, 1949, and is married to Stanley Cloud, with whom she often writes. In 1969 she graduated from University of Arizona. Before becoming a writer she worked for the Associated Press and the Baltimore Sun. She has written several books on the history of the World War II era, which have received positive critical reviews.

Awards and honors
In 2002 she won the Christopher Award for her book Freedom's Daughters: The Unsung Heroines of the Civil Rights Movement from 1830 to 1970.

Selected bibliography
The Murrow Boys: Pioneers on the Front Lines of Broadcast Journalism (1996, with Stanley Cloud) 
Freedom's Daughters: The Unsung Heroines of the Civil Rights Movement from 1830 to 1970 (2002) 
A Question of Honor: The Kosciuszko Squadron: Forgotten Heroes of World War II (2003, with Stanley Cloud) 
Troublesome Young Men: The Rebels Who Brought Churchill to Power and Helped Save England (2007) 
Citizens of London: The Americans Who Stood with Britain in Its Darkest, Finest Hour (2011) 
Those Angry Days: Roosevelt, Lindbergh, and America's Fight Over World War II, 1939–1941 (2013) 
Last Hope Island: Britain, Occupied Europe, and the Brotherhood That Helped Turn the Tide of War (2017) 
Madame Fourcade's Secret War: The Daring Young Woman Who Led France's Largest Spy Network Against Hitler (2019) 
Empress of the Nile: The Daredevil Archaeologist Who Saved Egypt's Ancient Temples from Destruction (2023)

References

External links

1949 births
Living people
University of Arizona alumni
American women journalists
21st-century American women writers
21st-century American non-fiction writers